Indiana was admitted to the Union on December 11, 1816. Since then, the state has been represented in the United States Senate by 44 different men in Class 1 and 3; David Turpie served non-consecutive terms in Class 1, Dan Coats served non-consecutive terms in Class 3, and William E. Jenner served in both Classes. Until the passage of the Seventeenth Amendment to the United States Constitution in 1913, Senators were elected by the Indiana General Assembly; after that, they were elected popularly by Indiana citizens. A senatorial term lasts six years beginning on January 3. In case of a vacancy, the Governor of Indiana has the duty to appoint a new U.S. senator. Indiana's current U.S. senators are Republicans Todd Young (serving since 2017) and Mike Braun (serving since 2019).

List of senators

|- style="height:2em"
! rowspan=8 | 1
| rowspan=8 align=left | James Noble
| rowspan=5  | Democratic-Republican
| rowspan=8 nowrap | Dec 11, 1816 –Feb 26, 1831
| rowspan=3 | Elected in 1816.
| rowspan=3 | 1
| 
| rowspan=2 | 1
| rowspan=2 | Elected in 1816.
| rowspan=5 nowrap | Dec 11, 1816 –Mar 3, 1825
| rowspan=5  | Democratic-Republican
| rowspan=5 align=right | Waller Taylor
! rowspan=5 | 1

|- style="height:2em"
| 

|- style="height:2em"
| 
| rowspan=3 | 2
| rowspan=3 | Re-elected in 1818.Retired.

|- style="height:2em"
| rowspan=3 | Re-elected in 1821.
| rowspan=3 | 2
| 

|- style="height:2em"
| 

|- style="height:2em"
| rowspan=3  | NationalRepublican
| 
| rowspan=4 | 3
| rowspan=4 | Elected in 1824.
| rowspan=9 nowrap | Mar 4, 1825 –Mar 3, 1837
| rowspan=9  | NationalRepublican
| rowspan=9 align=right | William Hendricks
! rowspan=9 | 2

|- style="height:2em"
| rowspan=2 | Re-elected in 1827.Died.
| rowspan=4 | 3
| 

|- style="height:2em"
| rowspan=2 

|- style="height:2em"
| rowspan=2 colspan=3 | Vacant
| rowspan=2 nowrap | Feb 26, 1831 –Aug 19, 1831
| rowspan=2 |  

|- style="height:2em"
| rowspan=3 
| rowspan=5 | 4
| rowspan=5 | Re-elected in 1830.Lost re-election.

|- style="height:2em"
! 2
| align=left | Robert Hanna
|  | NationalRepublican
| nowrap | Aug 19, 1831 –Jan 3, 1832
| Appointed to continue Noble's term.Retired when successor qualified.
|  

|- style="height:2em"
! rowspan=4 | 3
| rowspan=4 align=left | John Tipton
| rowspan=3  | Jacksonian
| rowspan=4 nowrap | Jan 3, 1832 –Mar 3, 1839
| Elected to finish Noble's term.
|  

|- style="height:2em"
| rowspan=3 | Re-elected in 1832.Retired.
| rowspan=3 | 4
| 

|- style="height:2em"
| 

|- style="height:2em"
|  | Democratic
| 
| rowspan=3 | 5
| rowspan=3 | Elected in 1836.Lost re-election.
| rowspan=3 nowrap | Mar 4, 1837 –Mar 3, 1843
| rowspan=3  | Whig
| rowspan=3 align=right | Oliver H. Smith
! rowspan=3 | 3

|- style="height:2em"
! rowspan=3 | 4
| rowspan=3 align=left | Albert Smith White
| rowspan=3  | Whig
| rowspan=3 nowrap | Mar 4, 1839 –Mar 3, 1845
| rowspan=3 | Elected in 1838.Retired.
| rowspan=3 | 5
| 

|- style="height:2em"
| 

|- style="height:2em"
| 
| rowspan=3 | 6
| rowspan=3 | Elected in 1842.Lost renomination.
| rowspan=3 nowrap | Mar 4, 1843 –Mar 3, 1849
| rowspan=3  | Democratic
| rowspan=3 align=right | Ned Hannegan
! rowspan=3 | 4

|- style="height:2em"
! rowspan=13 | 5
| rowspan=13 align=left | Jesse D. Bright
| rowspan=13  | Democratic
| rowspan=13 nowrap | Mar 4, 1845 –Feb 5, 1862
| rowspan=3 | Elected in 1844.
| rowspan=3 | 6
| 

|- style="height:2em"
| 

|- style="height:2em"
| 
| rowspan=6 | 7
| rowspan=2 | Elected in 1848.Died.
| rowspan=2 nowrap | Mar 4, 1849 –Oct 4, 1852
| rowspan=2  | Democratic
| rowspan=2 align=right | James Whitcomb
! rowspan=2 | 5

|- style="height:2em"
| rowspan=7 | Re-elected in 1850.
| rowspan=7 | 7
| rowspan=4 

|- style="height:2em"
|  
| nowrap | Oct 4, 1852 –Dec 6, 1852
| colspan=3 | Vacant

|- style="height:2em"
| Appointed to continue Whitcomb's term.Retired when successor qualified.
| nowrap | Dec 6, 1852 –Jan 18, 1853
|  | Democratic
| align=right | Charles W. Cathcart
! 6

|- style="height:2em"
| rowspan=2 | Elected to finish Whitcomb's term.Lost re-election.
| rowspan=2 nowrap | Jan 18, 1853 –Mar 3, 1855
| rowspan=2  | Democratic
| rowspan=2 align=right | John Pettit
! rowspan=2 | 7

|- style="height:2em"
| 

|- style="height:2em"
| rowspan=2 
| rowspan=4 | 8
| Legislature failed to elect.
| nowrap | Mar 4, 1855 –Feb 4, 1857
| colspan=3 | Vacant

|- style="height:2em"
| rowspan=3 | Elected late in 1857.Retired.
| rowspan=3 nowrap | Feb 4, 1857 –Mar 3, 1861
| rowspan=3  | Democratic
| rowspan=3 align=right | Graham N. Fitch
! rowspan=3 | 8

|- style="height:2em"
| rowspan=3 | Re-elected in 1856.Expelled for sympathizing with the Confederacy.
| rowspan=6 | 8
| 

|- style="height:2em"
| 

|- style="height:2em"
| rowspan=4 
| rowspan=6 | 9
| rowspan=6 | Elected in 1860.Unknown if retired or lost re-election.
| rowspan=6 nowrap | Mar 4, 1861 –Mar 3, 1867
| rowspan=6  | Republican
| rowspan=6 align=right | Henry Smith Lane
! rowspan=6 | 9

|- style="height:2em"
| colspan=3 | Vacant
| nowrap | Feb 5, 1862 –Feb 24, 1862
|  

|- style="height:2em"
! 6
| align=left | Joseph A. Wright
|  | Unionist
| nowrap | Feb 24, 1862 –Jan 14, 1863
| Appointed to finish Bright's term.Retired when successor qualified.

|- style="height:2em"
! 7
| align=left | David Turpie
|  | Democratic
| nowrap | Jan 14, 1863 –Mar 3, 1863
| Elected to finish Bright's term.Retired.

|- style="height:2em"
! rowspan=3 | 8
| rowspan=3 align=left | Thomas A. Hendricks
| rowspan=3  | Democratic
| rowspan=3 nowrap | Mar 4, 1863 –Mar 3, 1869
| rowspan=3 | Elected in 1862.Retired.
| rowspan=3 | 9
| 

|- style="height:2em"
| 

|- style="height:2em"
| 
| rowspan=3 | 10
| rowspan=3 | Elected in 1867.
| rowspan=6 nowrap | Mar 4, 1867 –Nov 1, 1877
| rowspan=6  | Republican
| rowspan=6 align=right | Oliver P. Morton
! rowspan=6 | 10

|- style="height:2em"
! rowspan=3 | 9
| rowspan=3 align=left | Daniel D. Pratt
| rowspan=3  | Republican
| rowspan=3 nowrap | Mar 4, 1869 –Mar 3, 1875
| rowspan=3 | Elected in 1868.Retired.
| rowspan=3 | 10
| 

|- style="height:2em"
| 

|- style="height:2em"
| 
| rowspan=5 | 11
| rowspan=3 | Re-elected in 1873.Died.

|- style="height:2em"
! rowspan=5 | 10
| rowspan=5 align=left | Joseph E. McDonald
| rowspan=5  | Democratic
| rowspan=5 nowrap | Mar 4, 1875 –Mar 3, 1881
| rowspan=5 | Elected in 1874 or 1875Lost re-election.
| rowspan=5 | 11
| 

|- style="height:2em"
| rowspan=3 

|- style="height:2em"
|  
| nowrap | Nov 1, 1877 –Nov 6, 1877
| colspan=3 | Vacant

|- style="height:2em"
| Appointed to continue Morton's term.Elected in 1879 to finish Morton's term.
| rowspan=10 nowrap | Nov 6, 1877 –Mar 3, 1897
| rowspan=10  | Democratic
| rowspan=10 align=right | Daniel W. Voorhees
! rowspan=10 | 11

|- style="height:2em"
| 
| rowspan=3 | 12
| rowspan=3 | Re-elected in 1879.

|- style="height:2em"
! rowspan=3 | 11
| rowspan=3 align=left | Benjamin Harrison
| rowspan=3  | Republican
| rowspan=3 nowrap | Mar 4, 1881 –Mar 3, 1887
| rowspan=3 | Elected in 1881.Lost re-election.
| rowspan=3 | 12
| 

|- style="height:2em"
| 

|- style="height:2em"
| 
| rowspan=3 | 13
| rowspan=3 | Re-elected in 1885.

|- style="height:2em"
! rowspan=6 | 12
| rowspan=6 align=left | David Turpie
| rowspan=6  | Democratic
| rowspan=6 nowrap | Mar 4, 1887 –Mar 3, 1899
| rowspan=3 | Elected in 1887.
| rowspan=3 | 13
| 

|- style="height:2em"
| 

|- style="height:2em"
| 
| rowspan=3 | 14
| rowspan=3 | Re-elected in 1891.Lost re-election.

|- style="height:2em"
| rowspan=3 | Re-elected in 1893.Lost re-election.
| rowspan=3 | 14
| 

|- style="height:2em"
| 

|- style="height:2em"
| 
| rowspan=3 | 15
| rowspan=3 | Elected in 1897.
| rowspan=4 nowrap | Mar 4, 1897 –Mar 3, 1905
| rowspan=4  | Republican
| rowspan=4 align=right | Charles W. Fairbanks
! rowspan=4 | 12

|- style="height:2em"
! rowspan=6 | 13
| rowspan=6 align=left | Albert J. Beveridge
| rowspan=6  | Republican
| rowspan=6 nowrap | Mar 4, 1899 –Mar 3, 1911
| rowspan=3 | Elected in 1899.
| rowspan=3 | 15
| 

|- style="height:2em"
| 

|- style="height:2em"
| 
| rowspan=3 | 16
| Re-elected in 1903.Resigned to become U.S. Vice President.

|- style="height:2em"
| rowspan=3 | Re-elected in 1905.Lost re-election.
| rowspan=3 | 16
| 
| rowspan=2 | Elected to finish Fairbanks's term.Lost re-election.
| rowspan=2 nowrap | Mar 4, 1905 –Mar 3, 1909
| rowspan=2  | Republican
| rowspan=2 align=right | James A. Hemenway
! rowspan=2 | 13

|- style="height:2em"
| 

|- style="height:2em"
| 
| rowspan=3 | 17
| rowspan=3 | Elected in 1909.
| rowspan=4 nowrap | Mar 4, 1909 –Mar 14, 1916
| rowspan=4  | Democratic
| rowspan=4 align=right | Benjamin F. Shively
! rowspan=4 | 14

|- style="height:2em"
! rowspan=6 | 14
| rowspan=6 align=left | John W. Kern
| rowspan=6  | Democratic
| rowspan=6 nowrap | Mar 4, 1911 –Mar 3, 1917
| rowspan=6 | Elected in 1911.Lost re-election.
| rowspan=6 | 17
| 

|- style="height:2em"
| 

|- style="height:2em"
| rowspan=4 
| rowspan=6 | 18
| Re-elected in 1914.Died.

|- style="height:2em"
|  
| nowrap | Mar 14, 1916 –Mar 20, 1916
| colspan=3 | Vacant

|- style="height:2em"
| Appointed to continue Shiveley's term.Lost election to finish Shiveley's term.
| nowrap | Mar 20, 1916 –Nov 7, 1916
|  | Democratic
| align=right | Thomas Taggart
! 15

|- style="height:2em"
| rowspan=3 | Elected to finish Shiveley's term.
| rowspan=11 nowrap | Nov 8, 1916 –Mar 3, 1933
| rowspan=11  | Republican
| rowspan=11 align=right | James Eli Watson
! rowspan=11 | 16

|- style="height:2em"
! rowspan=3 | 15
| rowspan=3 align=left | Harry Stewart New
| rowspan=3  | Republican
| rowspan=3 nowrap | Mar 4, 1917 –Mar 3, 1923
| rowspan=3 | Elected in 1916.Lost renomination.
| rowspan=3 | 18
| 

|- style="height:2em"
| 

|- style="height:2em"
| 
| rowspan=5 | 19
| rowspan=5 | Re-elected in 1920.

|- style="height:2em"
! rowspan=2 | 16
| rowspan=2 align=left | Samuel M. Ralston
| rowspan=2  | Democratic
| rowspan=2 nowrap | Mar 4, 1923 –Oct 14, 1925
| rowspan=2 | Elected in 1922.Died.
| rowspan=5 | 19
| 

|- style="height:2em"
| rowspan=3 

|- style="height:2em"
| colspan=3 | Vacant
| nowrap | Oct 14, 1925 –Oct 20, 1925
|  

|- style="height:2em"
! rowspan=5 | 17
| rowspan=5 align=left | Arthur Raymond Robinson
| rowspan=5  | Republican
| rowspan=5 nowrap | Oct 20, 1925 –Jan 3, 1935
| rowspan=2 | Appointed to continue Ralston's term.Elected in 1926 to finish Ralston's term.

|- style="height:2em"
| 
| rowspan=3 | 20
| rowspan=3 | Re-elected in 1926.Lost re-election.

|- style="height:2em"
| rowspan=3 | Re-elected in 1928.Lost re-election.
| rowspan=3 | 20
| 

|- style="height:2em"
| 

|- style="height:2em"
| 
| rowspan=3 | 21
| rowspan=3 | Elected in 1932.
| rowspan=6 nowrap | Mar 4, 1933 –Jan 25, 1944
| rowspan=6  | Democratic
| rowspan=6 align=right | Frederick Van Nuys
! rowspan=6 | 17

|- style="height:2em"
! rowspan=3 | 18
| rowspan=3 align=left | Sherman Minton
| rowspan=3  | Democratic
| rowspan=3 nowrap | Jan 3, 1935 –Jan 3, 1941
| rowspan=3 | Elected in 1934.Lost re-election.
| rowspan=3 | 21
| 

|- style="height:2em"
| 

|- style="height:2em"
| 
| rowspan=6 | 22
| rowspan=3 | Re-elected in 1938.Died.

|- style="height:2em"
! rowspan=6 | 19
| rowspan=6 align=left | Raymond E. Willis
| rowspan=6  | Republican
| rowspan=6 nowrap | Jan 3, 1941 –Jan 3, 1947
| rowspan=6 | Elected in 1940.Retired.
| rowspan=6 | 22
| 

|- style="height:2em"
| rowspan=4 

|- style="height:2em"
|  
| nowrap | Jan 25, 1944 –Jan 28, 1944
| colspan=3 | Vacant

|- style="height:2em"
| Appointed to continue Van Nuys's term.Retired when successor elected.
| nowrap | Jan 28, 1944 –Nov 13, 1944
|  | Democratic
| align=right | Samuel D. Jackson
! 18

|- style="height:2em"
| Elected to finish Van Nuys's term.Retired.
| nowrap | Nov 14, 1944 –Jan 3, 1945
|  | Republican
| align=right | William E. Jenner
! 19

|- style="height:2em"
| 
| rowspan=3 | 23
| rowspan=3 | Elected in 1944.
| rowspan=9 nowrap | Jan 3, 1945 –Jan 3, 1963
| rowspan=9  | Republican
| rowspan=9 align=right | Homer E. Capehart
! rowspan=9 | 20

|- style="height:2em"
! rowspan=6 | 20
| rowspan=6 align=left | William E. Jenner
| rowspan=6  | Republican
| rowspan=6 nowrap | Jan 3, 1947 –Jan 3, 1959
| rowspan=3 | Elected in 1946.
| rowspan=3 | 23
| 

|- style="height:2em"
| 

|- style="height:2em"
| 
| rowspan=3 | 24
| rowspan=3 | Re-elected in 1950.

|- style="height:2em"
| rowspan=3 | Re-elected in 1952.Retired.
| rowspan=3 | 24
| 

|- style="height:2em"
| 

|- style="height:2em"
| 
| rowspan=3 | 25
| rowspan=3 | Re-elected in 1956.Lost re-election.

|- style="height:2em"
! rowspan=9 | 21
| rowspan=9 align=left | Vance Hartke
| rowspan=9  | Democratic
| rowspan=9 nowrap | Jan 3, 1959 –Jan 3, 1977
| rowspan=3 | Elected in 1958.
| rowspan=3 | 25
| 

|- style="height:2em"
| 

|- style="height:2em"
| 
| rowspan=3 | 26
| rowspan=3 | Elected in 1962.
| rowspan=9 nowrap | Jan 3, 1963 –Jan 3, 1981
| rowspan=9  | Democratic
| rowspan=9 align=right | Birch Bayh
! rowspan=9 | 21

|- style="height:2em"
| rowspan=3 | Re-elected in 1964.
| rowspan=3 | 26
| 

|- style="height:2em"
| 

|- style="height:2em"
| 
| rowspan=3 | 27
| rowspan=3 | Re-elected in 1968.

|- style="height:2em"
| rowspan=3 | Re-elected in 1970.Lost re-election.
| rowspan=3 | 27
| 

|- style="height:2em"
| 

|- style="height:2em"
| 
| rowspan=3 | 28
| rowspan=3 | Re-elected in 1974.Lost re-election.

|- style="height:2em"
! rowspan=18 | 22
| rowspan=18 align=left | Richard Lugar
| rowspan=18  | Republican
| rowspan=18 nowrap | Jan 3, 1977 –Jan 3, 2013
| rowspan=3 | Elected in 1976.
| rowspan=3 | 28
| 

|- style="height:2em"
| 

|- style="height:2em"
| 
| rowspan=3 | 29
| rowspan=3 | Elected in 1980.
| rowspan=4 nowrap | Jan 3, 1981 –Jan 3, 1989
| rowspan=4  | Republican
| rowspan=4 align=right | Dan Quayle
! rowspan=4 | 22

|- style="height:2em"
| rowspan=3 | Re-elected in 1982.
| rowspan=3 | 29
| 

|- style="height:2em"
| 

|- style="height:2em"
| 
| rowspan=3 | 30
| Re-elected in 1986.Resigned to become U.S. Vice President.

|- style="height:2em"
| rowspan=3 | Re-elected in 1988.
| rowspan=3 | 30
| 
| rowspan=2 | Appointed to continue Quayle's term.Elected in 1990 to finish Quayle's term.
| rowspan=5 nowrap | Jan 3, 1989 –Jan 3, 1999
| rowspan=5  | Republican
| rowspan=5 align=right | Dan Coats
! rowspan=5 | 23

|- style="height:2em"
| 

|- style="height:2em"
| 
| rowspan=3 | 31
| rowspan=3 | Re-elected in 1992.Retired.

|- style="height:2em"
| rowspan=3 | Re-elected in 1994.
| rowspan=3 | 31
| 

|- style="height:2em"
| 

|- style="height:2em"
| 
| rowspan=3 | 32
| rowspan=3 | Elected in 1998.
| rowspan=6 nowrap | Jan 3, 1999 –Jan 3, 2011
| rowspan=6  | Democratic
| rowspan=6 align=right | Evan Bayh
! rowspan=6 | 24

|- style="height:2em"
| rowspan=3 | Re-elected in 2000.
| rowspan=3 | 32
| 

|- style="height:2em"
| 

|- style="height:2em"
| 
| rowspan=3 | 33
| rowspan=3 | Re-elected in 2004.Retired.

|- style="height:2em"
| rowspan=3 | Re-elected in 2006.Lost renomination.
| rowspan=3 | 33
| 

|- style="height:2em"
| 

|- style="height:2em"
| 
| rowspan=3 | 34
| rowspan=3 | Elected in 2010.Retired.
| rowspan=3 | Jan 3, 2011 –Jan 3, 2017
| rowspan=3  | Republican
| rowspan=3 align=right | Dan Coats
! rowspan=3 | 25

|- style="height:2em"
! rowspan=3 | 23
| rowspan=3 align=left | Joe Donnelly
| rowspan=3  | Democratic
| rowspan=3 | Jan 3, 2013 –Jan 3, 2019
| rowspan=3 | Elected in 2012.Lost re-election.
| rowspan=3 | 34
| 

|- style="height:2em"
| 

|- style="height:2em"
| 
| rowspan=3 | 35
| rowspan=3 | Elected in 2016.
| rowspan=6 nowrap | Jan 3, 2017 –Present
| rowspan=6  | Republican
| rowspan=6 align=right | Todd Young
! rowspan=6 | 26

|- style="height:2em"
! rowspan=3 | 24
| rowspan=3 align=left | Mike Braun
| rowspan=3  | Republican
| rowspan=3 | Jan 3, 2019 –Present
| rowspan=3 | Elected in 2018.Retiring at end of term to run for Governor of Indiana.
| rowspan=3 | 35
| 

|- style="height:2em"
| 

|- style="height:2em"
| 
| rowspan=3 | 36
| rowspan=3 | Re-elected in 2022.

|- style="height:2em"
| rowspan=3 colspan=5 | To be determined in the 2024 election.
| rowspan=3 | 36
| 

|- style="height:2em"
| 

|- style="height:2em"
| 
| 37
| colspan=5 | To be determined in the 2028 election.

See also

 List of United States representatives from Indiana
 United States congressional delegations from Indiana
 Elections in Indiana

References and external links

 
 

 
United States senators
Indiana